Glasin is a municipality in the Nordwestmecklenburg district, Mecklenburg-Western Pomerania, Germany.

Geography
The municipality of Glasin borders on the district of Rostock in the east.
It is located in an end moraine area, which extends from Kühlungsborn to the area of the upper Warnow river. The "Fuchsberg" is the highest point of this municipality, with a total height of 341.2 feet  (104m) above sea level. In the south, the municipality of Glasin borders on Lake Gross Tessin. Glasin is approx. 14 miles (22 km) east of the Hanseatic League City Wismar and 29 miles (46 km) southwest of the Hanseatic League City Rostock.

Organization of the municipality
The municipality of Glasin includes the following villages:

History
Glasin was first mentioned in 1248, Babst in 1267.

Politics
Mayor is Mr. Joachim Wittke, who has been elected several times.

Economy
The kindergarten "Gaensebluemchen", a restaurant (which is available for private parties only) and a voluntary fire department are located in Glasin.

Beside agricultural businesses you'll find some very small trade businesses, like a wheelwright's workshop, a corn workshop and a gas station. In Perniek, a part of this municipality, is an open cast mining of gravel/sand granulate.

Infrastructure
Glasin is accessible by car from the Bundesautobahn 20 (Lübeck–Greifswald) exit 11 Neukloster/Glasin.
The nearest railroad station is Steinhausen-Neuburg in Neuburg, served by local trains between Rostock and Wismar. The nearest airport is Rostock Laage Airport (31 miles/50 km).

References

Nordwestmecklenburg